The 1983–84 NBA season was the Warriors' 38th season in the NBA and 21st in the San Francisco Bay Area.

Draft picks

Roster

Regular season

Season standings

z - clinched division title
y - clinched division title
x - clinched playoff spot

Record vs. opponents

Game log

Player statistics

Awards and records

Transactions

References

See also
 1983-84 NBA season

Golden State Warriors seasons
Gold
Golden
Golden